The thoracic spinal nerve 1 (T1) is a spinal nerve of the thoracic segment.

It originates from the spinal column from below the thoracic vertebra 1 (T1).

Additional Images

References

Spinal nerves